Springland International Holdings Ltd is a Chinese retail company traded on the Hong Kong Stock Exchange. Springland International is predominantly a retail chain operator in the Yangtze River Delta. It operates department stores and supermarkets.

Springland International is also the holding company of YAOHAN, SPRINGLAND & T&T Supermarket (Datonghua).

Background & IPO
Springland was founded in 1996 in Yixing, Jiangsu by Chen Jianqiang. In 2011, Chen was included in the Forbes list of richest people. This was shortly after his company was listed on the Hong Kong Stock Exchange in October 2010. IPO was floated with aim to raise $478 million by selling 625 million shares (price range HKD 4.85 to HKD 5.93 each). Of the offering, 80% were new shares and the rest were secondary shares. Morgan Stanley handled the IPO of Springland International.

Department stores
Company focused on developing business in the Greater Yangtze River Delta and (as at 30 June 2010), the company was operating 10 department stores and 16 supermarkets there. It has stores in; 
Yixing
Jiangyin
Liyang
Danyang
Changshu
Jintan

Springland International's department stores offer primarily following categories of merchandise;
Fashion & apparel
Cosmetics
Jewellery & accessories
Footwear
Athletic apparel & casual wear
Children wear & home furnishing
Household & electronic appliances
Others

Supermarkets
Springland International's supermarket offers food, and non-food merchandise. Most of the supermarkets are located in cities in the Greater Yangtze River Delta.

Branding

Department store
Springland International operates its department stores (other than department stores in Wuxi, Ma’anshan, Nantong & Zhenjiang), under the trade name of Springland (Chinese: 華地). In Wuxi, Ma’anshan, Nantong & Zhenjiang, the department stores are operated under trade name of Yaohan (Chinese: 八佰伴).

Supermarket 
Springland International operates its supermarket business under the trade name of Datonghua (Chinese: 大統華).

References 

Companies listed on the Hong Kong Stock Exchange
Companies based in Wuxi
Chinese companies established in 1996
Retail companies established in 1996
Chinese brands
Department stores of China
Supermarkets of China